Jose "Dodong" Rivera Gullas (February 1, 1934 – February 25, 2021) was a Filipino Visayan politician from Cebu, Philippines. The son of Vicente Gullas and Pining Rivera, he has been elected to one term as a Member of the House of Representatives of the Philippines, representing the 1st District of Cebu from 2001 to 2004.  He died on February 25, 2021, at 87 after a short battle with pancreatic cancer and was buried on March 3, 2021, at the Daughters of Saint Teresa compound in Valladolid, Carcar.

References

1934 births
2021 deaths
Nationalist People's Coalition politicians
Members of the House of Representatives of the Philippines from Cebu
People from Cebu
University of the Visayas alumni